Nathan Allan de Souza (born 13 March 1996), simply known as Nathan, is a Brazilian footballer who plays for Atlético Mineiro. Mainly an attacking midfielder, he has also been deployed throughout his career in a central midfield role, as well as a winger and a second striker.

Club career

Atlético Paranaense
Born in Blumenau, Santa Catarina, Nathan joined Atlético Paranaense's prolific youth setup in 2009, at the age of 13. He was promoted to the main squad in 2014, initially appearing with the under-23 team in Campeonato Paranaense. His debut came on 29 January in the first stage of the Copa Libertadores away at Sporting Cristal, playing ten minutes in place of Marcelo Cirino in a 1–2 loss. A week later in the second leg, he came on as a substitute and had his attempt saved in the penalty shootout, although his team advanced nonetheless.

Nathan made his Série A debut on 22 May, coming on as a second-half substitute for Paulinho Dias in a 1–1 away draw against Corinthians. In October, after rejecting a contract renewal, the club and the player went to court, with him being demoted back to the under-23s.

Chelsea
On 1 July 2015, Nathan joined Chelsea for an undisclosed fee rumoured to be in the region of £4.5 million, having initially confirming he had signed in May 2015.

Loan to Vitesse
Nine days after signing for Chelsea, it was announced that Nathan was join to Dutch side Vitesse Arnhem on loan, along with Isaiah Brown and Lewis Baker. He made his debut on 6 August in a UEFA Europa League third qualifying round second leg against Southampton at the GelreDome, replacing Baker for the final 21 minutes of a 0–2 home defeat for a 0–5 aggregate elimination. He made his Eredivisie debut three days later in a 1–1 draw against Willem II, replacing Brown with 25 minutes to spare. On 14 August he scored his first goal, again as a substitute, concluding a 3–0 home win over Roda JC. On 4 October, Nathan scored his second goal for the club in a 5–0 victory over FC Groningen.

On 9 June 2016, Nathan's loan at Vitesse was extended for the 2016/17 campaign. On the opening day of 2016/17 season, Nathan scored a brace against Willem II in a 4–1 win.

He played as Vitesse won the final of the KNVB Beker 2–0 against AZ Alkmaar on 30 April 2017 to lead the club, 3-time runners up, to the title for the first time in its 125-year history.

Loan to Amiens
On 31 August 2017, Nathan joined Ligue 1 side Amiens on a season-long loan. On 17 September 2017, he made his debut during Amiens' 2–0 away defeat against Marseille, replacing Bongani Zungu in the 81st minute. Nathan went onto feature twice more in the Coupe de la Ligue, before terminating his loan spell in January and returning to Chelsea.

Loan to Belenenses
Following his return from Amiens, Nathan opted to join Portuguese side Belenenses on loan for the remainder of the campaign in January 2018.

Atlético Mineiro
On 24 July 2018, Nathan agreed a deal to return to his native country to join Atlético Mineiro on a season-long loan, which was extended until mid-2020. On 1 July 2020, he joined the club on a permanent basis, signing a four-year contract.

On 4 January 2022, Nathan joined Fluminense on a season-long loan.

International career
Nathan has represented Brazil in both under-17 and under-20 levels. He made his debut with the under-17s during the 2013 FIFA U-17 World Cup, scoring five goals, including  braces in the 6–1 group stage wins against Slovakia and hosts United Arab Emirates. He scored their equaliser in the 1–1 draw against holders Mexico in the quarter-finals and netted in the subsequent penalty shootout, but Mexico won 11–10. Nathan was voted as the second best player of the tournament, winning the Silver Ball.

He was also included in Alexandre Gallo's 23-man squad for the 2015 South American Youth Championship held in Uruguay. Nathan appeared in all matches during the competition, scoring his first goal on 4 February, netting the first in a 5–0 routing over Peru.

Style of play
Tim Vickery, a reporter on South American football, called Nathan "a playmaker who can thread a little pass". He said that although he performed well as an under-17 international, his performances at under-20 were below standard, concluding that "it’s difficult to see what he has done in the last season to justify interest from Chelsea."

Career statistics

Honours
Vitesse
KNVB Cup: 2016–17

Atlético Mineiro
Campeonato Brasileiro Série A: 2021
Copa do Brasil: 2021
Campeonato Mineiro: 2020, 2021

Individual
FIFA U-17 World Cup Silver Ball: 2013 
Campeonato Mineiro Team of the Year: 2020

References

External links
 Nathan at playmakerstats.com (English version of ogol.com.br)
 

1996 births
Living people
People from Blumenau
Sportspeople from Santa Catarina (state)
Brazilian footballers
Association football midfielders
Association football forwards
Club Athletico Paranaense players
Chelsea F.C. players
SBV Vitesse players
Amiens SC players
C.F. Os Belenenses players
Clube Atlético Mineiro players
Fluminense FC players
Eredivisie players
Ligue 1 players
Primeira Liga players
Brazilian expatriate footballers
Brazilian expatriate sportspeople in England
Brazilian expatriate sportspeople in the Netherlands
Brazilian expatriate sportspeople in France
Brazilian expatriate sportspeople in Portugal
Expatriate footballers in England
Expatriate footballers in the Netherlands
Expatriate footballers in France
Expatriate footballers in Portugal
Brazil youth international footballers
Brazil under-20 international footballers
2015 South American Youth Football Championship players
Campeonato Brasileiro Série A players